"To My Sorrow" is a country music song written by Vernice J. McAlpin, sung by Eddy Arnold (and His Texas Plowboys), and released in 1947 on the RCA Victor label (catalog no. 20-2481-A). In November 1947, it reached No. 2 on the Billboard folk juke box chart. It was also ranked as the No. 12 record on the Billboard 1947 year-end folk juke box chart.

References

Eddy Arnold songs
1947 songs